This is a list of waterways, defined as navigable rivers, canals, estuaries, lakes, or firths. In practice, and depending on the language, the term "waterway" covers maritime or inland transport routes, as suggested by "way". Wherever a free-flowing river cannot bear load-carrying vessels, the correct term is "watercourse", with no connotation of use for transportation of cargo. To be of practical use, the list distinguishes international maritime waterways (including ship canals), international inland waterways, then inland waterways, including canals and large lakes.

Lists

International waterways
 List of interoceanic canals
 List of transcontinental canals

International maritime waterways
 Danish straits
 Great Belt
 Øresund
 Turkish Straits
 Bosphorus
 Sea of Marmara
 Dardanelles
 Strait of Malacca

International inland waterways
 St. Croix River (Canada, United States)
 Danube (Germany, Austria, Slovakia, Hungary, Croatia, Serbia, Bulgaria, Moldova, Ukraine, Romania)
 Rhine (Switzerland, Liechtenstein, Austria, Germany, France, Netherlands)
 Mekong (China, Myanmar, Laos, Thailand, Vietnam)
 Nile River (Egypt, Sudan, South Sudan, Uganda)
 Lake Victoria (Uganda, Tanzania, Kenya)
 Congo River and its tributaries (Republic of the Congo, Democratic Republic of the Congo, Central African Republic)
 Colorado River (US, Mexico)
 Great Lakes Waterway (US, Canada)

Waterways by country

Argentina
 Rio de La Plata
 Parana River

Australia
 Bass Strait
 Murray River

Austria
 Danube River

Azerbaijan
 Caspian Sea - Note: the capital city of Azerbaijan, Baku is a port on this sea.

Belgium
 Meuse River
 Scheldt River

Bolivia
 Lake Titicaca

Brazil
 Amazon River
 Parana River

Canada
 Saint John (Woolastook) River
Northwest Passage
 Saint Lawrence Seaway
 Mackenzie River
 St. Marys River and canal of Ontario
 Detroit River
 St. Clair River
 Welland Canal
 Lake St. Clair
 Lake Superior
 Saskatchewan River
 Hudson Strait and Hudson Bay
 Great Bear Lake, including Port Radium

Chile
 Valdivia River
 Bueno River (before 1960 Valdivia earthquake)

China
 Amur River
 Yalu River
 Yangtze River 
 Yellow River

Egypt
 Nile River
 Lake Nasser
 Suez Canal
 Gulf of Suez 
 Gulf of Aqaba

France
 Rhine River
 Rhone River
 Seine River
 Meuse River
 List of canals in France

Germany
 Rhine River
 Main River
 Rhine-Main-Danube Canal
 Danube River
 Elbe River
 Kiel Canal

India-Bangladesh
 Brahmaputra River - Sadiya to Dhubri stretch (891 km)
 Ganges River - Prayagraj to Haldia stretch (1,620 km)

Iran
 Caspian Sea
 Persian Gulf
 Karun

Netherlands

 IJsselmeer
 Meuse (Maas)
 Rhine River
 Scheldt River
 Waal River

New Zealand

 Cook Strait
 Foveaux Strait
 Hauraki Gulf
 Lake Wakatipu
 Whanganui River

Pakistan

 Chenab River
 Indus River

Paraguay
 Paraná River
 Paraguay River

Peru
 Amazon River
 Lake Titicaca

Philippines
San Bernardino Strait
 Surigao Strait
 Manila Bay

Portugal
Douro River

Romania
 Danube River
 Danube–Black Sea Canal
 Bega (Tisza)

Russia
 Volga-Baltic Waterway
 White Sea – Baltic Canal
 Amur River
 Caspian Sea
 Lake Baikal
 Dnieper River
 Don River
 Lena River
 Neva River
 Ob River

Serbia
 Danube River
 Sava River

Slovakia
 Danube River

Switzerland
 Lake Constance 
 Lake Geneva
 Rhine River

Turkey
 Bosporus
 Dardanelles
 Sea of Marmara
 Black Sea

United Kingdom
 River Severn
 River Thames
 Humber River

 Waterways in the United Kingdom

United States

 Mississippi River System
 Missouri River
 Monongahela River
 Ohio River
 St. Lawrence Seaway
 Atlantic Intracoastal Waterway
 Chesapeake Bay
 Columbia River
 Delaware River
 Detroit River
 Erie Canal
 Gulf Intracoastal Waterway
 Hudson River
 Lake Champlain
 Lake Michigan
 Lake Superior
 Sacramento River
 Savannah River
 St. Clair River
 St. Marys River and canal of Michigan
 Tennessee River
 Tennessee-Tombigbee Waterway
 List of canals in the United States

Ukraine
 Dnieper River

Uruguay
 Rio de la Plata
 Uruguay River

Vietnam
 Mekong River

See also
 List of canal engineer
 List of canals by country

 
Waterways
Waterways